Sagbayan, officially the Municipality of Sagbayan,  is a 4th class municipality in the province of Bohol, Philippines. According to the 2020 census, it has a population of 24,335 people.

Its main attraction is Sagbayan Peak, a tourism site overlooking a scenic valley with an observation platform and children's playground. While some similar hill formations are visible, it is not within the main Chocolate Hills area.

The town of Sagbayan, Bohol celebrates its feast on May 4/August 28, to honor the town patron San Agustin.

Etymology

The name Sagbayan came from the combination of the local words Sag which means nest, and Bay (short of Balay) which means house. Therefore, Sagbayan means a place for making tree-houses. 

Long ago, the place was said to be plenty of deers and wild pig. People  often visit the place to hunt them. They constructed tree houses while waiting for their prey to appear. As time goes, these animals were depopulated, leaving only tree houses left by the hunters.

The proper pronunciation of word Ságbayan has a stress on its first syllable, not Sagbayán, which has stress on its suffix -an, therefore debunking the word Sagbayán which means a place to hang.

History

Sagbayan was formerly part of the surrounding municipalities of Clarin, Inabanga, Carmen, and Balilihan. It was created into a separate town through Executive Order No. 204 of President Elpidio Quirino on February 9, 1949, and named Borja, in honor of Salustiano Borja, the first elected civil governor of the Province of Bohol. 

The original list of its barangays and sitios were Sagbayan, Canmaya Centro, Canmaya Diot, Canmano, San Antonio, and San Isidro, and the sitios of Santa Cruz, San Vicente Norte, San Vicente Sur, San Ramon, and Kalangahan (Calangahan), from Clarin; the sitios of Mantalongon and Katipunan from Inabanga, and the sitios of Cabasacan (Kabasacan) and Ubuhan (Ubojan) from Balilihan (note: Catigbian is still part of Balilihan until its reorganization on June 17, 1949). Barangay Sagbayan became its Poblacion which is the seat of government of the municipality.

Through the Republic Act No. 1741, it was reverted to its original name, Sagbayan on June 21, 1957, signed by President Carlos P. Garcia.

On October 15, 2013, Sagbayan was close to the epicenter of a magnitude 7.2 earthquake. The town suffered 12 fatalities and damage to almost 1,000 homes, as well as total destruction of its town hall.

Geography

Barangays
Sagbayan comprises 24 barangays:

Climate

Demographics

Economy

Gallery

See also

List of renamed cities and municipalities of the Philippines

References

External links

 [ Philippine Standard Geographic Code]
Sagbayan
Municipality of Sagbayan
Sagbayan Peak Viewdeck - overlooking Chocolate hills

Municipalities of Bohol
Establishments by Philippine executive order